As part of the sanctions imposed on the Russian Federation as a result of the Russo-Ukrainian War, on 3 December 2022, the European Union (EU) agreed to cap the price of natural gas in order to reduce the volatility created by Russia's in the gas market.

In 2021 the EU imported 83% of its natural gas, but following the invasion of Ukraine gas imports from Russia have fallen, partly due to the increasing cost, partly because of reductions in supply from Russia, partly through reduction of consumption and partly because of a desire to move away from Russia's Gazprom as a supplier.

The price cap would become effective from 15 February 2023 at €180 per megawatt-hour.

Discussions on price cap proposals

The EU originally proposed that a gas market correction mechanism would kick in when the price of month-ahead contracts on the Dutch Title Transfer Facility (TTF) exceeded €275 per megawatt hour and the gap between world prices was greater than €58.

The Czech Republic, which holds the rotating presidency of the bloc, proposed a second compromise for a broader price cap — lowering the intervention threshold to €220. 12 member states had demanded to decrease the previously proposed price ceiling of €275. Lithuania, Latvia, Poland, Romania, Italy, Greece, Croatia, Slovenia, Slovakia, Belgium, Bulgaria, and Malta came out in favour of lowering gas prices.

The price in December 2021 topped €180 before declining to below €100. Another peak in early March 2022 hit €220, before again declining to below €120. Between late July and late September the price was mainly above €200, with the highest in late August at €340, before declining again to below €150.   

There are concerns from some that an intervention could cause greater volatility in the market.

Price cap price

The European Energy ministers agreed, on 19 December 2022, on a price cap for natural Gas at €180 per megawatt-hour, with Austria and the Netherlands abstaining and Hungary voting against. This equates to about $55/MMBtu.

Reactions

Azerbaijan 

Azerbaijan announced that its supply of gas to Europe would be 30% higher in 2022 than in 2021 and that an agreement had been signed in July 2022 to increase gas supplies to Europe from around 8 to 20 billion m3 by 2027.

Hungary

Hungary, which had recently signed a long-term contract with Russia, had objected to the principle of the price cap, according they were given freedom, without notification to, or consent from, the EU to keep or modify their current contract with Russia.

Russia

Russian deputy prime minister Alexander Novak said that the cap on the price of gas was "just another political decision, absolutely not an economic one." Russia reported that it believed the sanction would lead to gas shortages which would destabilise Europe.

Ukraine

The only operational gas pipeline from Russia to the west is the Urengoy–Pomary–Uzhhorod pipeline, originating from the Urengoy gas field, it enters Ukraine at the Sudzha gas metering station. The agreement between Russia and Ukraine limits the daily gas level to 42.5mcm. Ukraine has refused to allow gas to be sent from the Sokhranovka gas pumping station through the Soyuz pipeline.

Operation of sanctions

EU energy ministers have reached an agreement to cap gas prices in the bloc when they exceed the price cap for three days. Operational from 15 February 2023 and applying to gas contracts traded on the TTF between one month and a year ahead. Prices must also be €35 per megawatt hour above an average of global liquefied natural gas prices in order to be triggered.

The price must be above the cap price for three working days and be €35 per megawatt hour above an average of global liquefied natural gas prices. Then the cap will remain in place for 20 days, after that date it will cease if trade is then below the cap price for three working days. The EU can deactivate the cap in the event of an emergency such as a risk of loss of supplies.   

The cap will not apply to private gas trades, those arranged outside energy exchanges, although there is an option to review this later, once the price cap is in force.

December 2022 

Between December 15 and December 23 natural gas prices fell €49 to €85 due to a combination of high LNG imports, high levels of storage and lower demand in Europe. At 28 December, the EU storage capacity was at 83.2% and the price of January delivery gas had fallen to €76.18pmh.

Russian gas exports to countries outside of the Commonwealth of Independent States (CIS) totaled 100.9bcm in 2022 compared to 185.1b in 2021 a fall of 45.5%. Gazprom overall production in 2022 was 413bcm, down from 515bcm in 2021 which will affect the profitability of Gazprom, who is restricted in the price it can sell gas for to the domestic market. 2022 exports to China of 15bcm generated under USD4b at a price around USD25pmh.

January to March 2023 

The warm weather in Europe continued into the new year with 4 January prices dropping to €64.20pmh. January gas supplied by Russia to Europe was 1.7b m3 compared with 13b m3 average per month for the 2021 year.

The price of natural gas in Europe fell to an 18 month low in mid February of €49pmh with gas storage across the European Union at 65% capacity, well above the average of 45% at this time of year.

See also

References

Sanctions and boycotts during the Russo-Ukrainian War
2020s in international relations
2022 in economics
Energy crises
Foreign relations of Russia
International sanctions
Reactions to the 2022 Russian invasion of Ukraine
Russo-Ukrainian War